This article lists results for Neftçi PFK in European competition.

Summary

Neftçi PFK is an association football club from Baku, Azerbaijan. The team has participated in 12 seasons of Union of European Football Associations (UEFA) club competitions, including 5 seasons in the European Cup and Champions League, 5 seasons in the UEFA Cup, one season in the Cup Winners' Cup, one season in the Intertoto Cup and one season in the Europa League. It has played 42 UEFA games, resulting in 12 wins, 11 draws and 19 defeats.

In European competitions, the club also have advanced to the second qualifying round of the UEFA Champions League twice, having defeated Bosnian champions – NK Široki Brijeg – and Icelandic champions – FH Hafnarfjarðar – in 2004 and 2005 respectively. In 2008, the club advanced to the third round of the 2008 Intertoto Cup, after defeating the Slovak club FC Nitra and the Belgian side K.F.C. Germinal Beerschot in the first two rounds.

Neftçi's biggest win in Europe is a 3–0 victory over FC Zestafoni in the 2012–13 UEFA Champions League.

The club has an excellent European cup record, having not lost at home since the 1999–2000 season.

Neftçi's home games are usually played at the Tofiq Bahramov Stadium in Baku. The stadium was built by German prisoners of war in 1951 and constructed in the shape of the letter C to honour Stalin (Cyrillic: Cтaлин), however it was renamed after famous football referee Tofiq Bahramov in 1993 after his death. The stadium also serves as the home ground of the Azerbaijan national football team and holds 30,000 spectators making it the largest stadium in the country. In 2011, Neftçi's domestic games moved to the Ismat Gayibov Stadium. In 2012, Neftçi's domestic games moved to Eighth Kilometer District Stadium – also known as the Bakcell Arena for sponsorship purposes is a stadium in Nizami raion, Baku, Azerbaijan.

In 2012-13, Group stage

In 2012, Neftçi became the first Azerbaijani team to advance to the group stage of a European competition. Neftçi managed to get three points in six matches, drawing with FK Partizan both times and holding Inter Milan at Stadio Giuseppe Meazza.

Group H

Note: Partizan are ranked ahead of Neftçi on head-to-head away goals (PAR: 1; NEF: 0).

Team statistics

Key

 S = Seasons
 P = Played
 W = Games won
 D = Games drawn
 L = Games lost
 GF = Goals for
 GA = Goals against
 aet = Match determined after extra time
 a = Match determined by away goals rule
 QF = Quarter-finals
 SF = Semi-finals
 TP = Match for third place
 F = Final

 Group = Group stage
 Group 2 = Second group stage
 PO = Play-off round
 R3 = Round 3
 R2 = Round 2
 R1 = Round 1
 Q3 = Third qualification round
 Q2 = Second qualification round
 Q1 = First qualification round
 QR = Qualification round
 p. = penalty shoot-out
 H = Home
 A = Away
 N = Neutral

Games

UEFA competitions
The following is a complete list of matches played by Neftçi in UEFA tournaments. It includes the season, tournament, the stage, the opponent club and its country, the date, the venue and the score, with Neftçi's score noted first. It is up to date as of the match played 3 July 2013.

Notes
Note 1: Neftçi played their home match at Dalga Arena, Baku as their own Ismat Gayibov Stadium did not meet UEFA criteria.
Note 2: Order of legs reversed after original draw.
Note 3: Ironi Kiryat Shmona played their home match at Kiryat Eliezer Stadium, Haifa as their own Kiryat Shmona Municipal Stadium did not meet UEFA criteria.
Note 4: Neftçi played their home matches at Tofiq Bahramov Republican Stadium, Baku instead of their regular stadium, Ismat Gayibov Stadium, Baku.

Non-UEFA competitions
In 2006, Neftçi managed to win the CIS Cup after defeating Kaunas in the final.

Notes
Note 5: Pyunik withdrew.

Honours
UEFA Intertoto Cup
Runners-up (1): 2008
CIS Cup
Winners (1): 2006
Runners-up (1): 2005
Kadyrov Cup
Third place (1): 2012

Finals

Participations
As of 29 June 2013, Neftçi have competed in:
UEFA competitions
6 participations in the UEFA Champions League
1 participations in the European Cup Winners' Cup
6 participations in the UEFA Cup / UEFA Europa League
1 participations in the UEFA Intertoto Cup
Non-UEFA competitions
5 participations in the CIS Cup
1 participations in the Kadyrov Cup

By competition

UEFA competitions

Non-UEFA competitions

By season

UEFA competitions

Non-UEFA competitions

By club

UEFA competitions
The following list shows statistics against opposing teams Neftçi has played three or more matches against in UEFA tournaments. It shows the club and its country, games played (P), won (W), drawn (D) and lost (L), goals for (F) and against (A). Statistics are as of the end of the 2012–13 season. The statistics include goals scored during extra time where applicable; in these games, the result given is the result at the end of extra time.

Non-UEFA competitions

By country

UEFA competitions

Non-UEFA competitions

Records

UEFA competitions
First UEFA club competition: UEFA Cup Winners' Cup
First match UEFA club competitions: Neftçi 0–3 APOEL, UEFA Cup Winners' Cup, first qualification round, 10 August 1995
First goal scored in the UEFA club competitions: Vidadi Rzayev, against PFC Lokomotiv Sofia, UEFA Cup, first qualification round, 17 July 1996
First win in the UEFA club competitions: Neftçi 2–1 PFC Lokomotiv Sofia, UEFA Cup, first qualification round, 17 July 1996
First group match in the UEFA club competitions: Neftçi 0–0 Partizan, UEFA Europa League, 20 September 2012
Biggest win in the UEFA club competitions: Neftçi 3–0 FC Zestafoni, UEFA Champions League, second qualification round, 17 July 2012
Biggest defeat in the UEFA club competitions: Neftçi 0–8 Widzew Łódź, in the UEFA Champions League, first qualification round, 23 July 1997
Seasons first date UEFA club competitions: 21 June (2008–09)
Seasons last date UEFA club competitions: 6 December (2012–13)
Most appearances in UEFA club competitions: 24 appearances
 Rashad Sadiqov

Top scorers in UEFA club competitions: 4 goals
 Rashad Sadiqov
 Julius Wobay

Non-UEFA competitions
First Non-UEFA club competitions: CIS Cup
First match Non-UEFA club competitions: Neftçi 0–1 Skonto Riga, CIS Cup, group stage, 25 January 1993
First win in the Non-UEFA club competitions: Neftçi 1–0 Sitora Dushanbe, CIS Cup, group stage, 31 January 1995
Biggest win in the UEFA club competitions: Neftçi 4–1 Nebitçi Balkanabat, CIS Cup, group stage, 16 January 2005
Biggest defeat in the UEFA club competitions: Neftçi 0–8 Spartak Moscow, in the CIS Cup, group stage, 27 January 1993

World and European rankings
Neftçi were ranked in the top 250 until 2013. Their last ranking was from December 20, 2012.Current club UEFA ranking

 Full List

Current national league UEFA ranking

 Full list

IFFHS World club ranking of the last decade(1 January 2001 – 31 December 2012), Source: IFFHS published 21 March 2012IFFHS Europe club ranking of the last decade(1 January 2001 – 31 December 2012), Source: IFFHS published 21 March 2012''

References

Bibliography

General

Specific

External links 

 Official website Neftçi PFK 
 Unofficial website Neftçi PFK 
 Neftçi PFK at UEFA.com
 Neftçi PFK at Soccerway.com
 Neftçi PFK at National-football-teams.com
 Neftçi PFK at Worldfootball.net
 Neftçi PFK on Facebook

Europe
Neftci